Francesco Ferrari (16 December 1946 – 23 May 2022) was an Italian politician. He was appointed to the European Parliament on 5 July 2007 to replace Marta Vincenzi, and sat in the Alliance of Liberals and Democrats for Europe group. He was a member of United in the Olive Tree – for Europe.

References

External links
 

1946 births
2022 deaths
Democratic Party (Italy) MEPs
MEPs for Italy 2004–2009
21st-century Italian politicians
Christian Democracy (Italy) politicians
Democracy is Freedom – The Daisy politicians
Democratic Party (Italy) politicians
Deputies of Legislature XI of Italy
Senators of Legislature XII of Italy
Deputies of Legislature XIII of Italy
Politicians from the Province of Brescia
Place of birth missing